Chandel is a town in Chandel district of Manipur, India. It is a part of Chandel subdivision. It comes under Outer Manipur (Lok Sabha constituency). As of the 2011 Census of India, Chandel had a population of  spread over 125 households.

References

 
Cities and towns in Chandel district